Jacques Jiha is the Director of the New York City Mayor's Office of Management and Budget. In this role, he oversees New York City’s fiscal policy, including the development of the Expense and Capital Budgets, the City’s bond and borrowing program, and the budgets of more than 90 City agencies and related entities. As Budget Director, he will continue to help lead New York City out of the financial crisis brought on by the COVID-19 pandemic through strong fiscal management. Previously, he served as Commissioner of the New York City Department of Finance, a position he has held in the administration of Mayor Bill de Blasio.

Jiha’s public service includes stints with the  Ways and Means Committee of the New York State Assembly as the principal economist and executive director of the New York State Legislative Tax Study Commission. He worked as Executive Vice President/Chief Operating Officer and Chief Financial Officer at the multimedia company Earl G. Graves Ltd./Black Enterprise.

Biography
Jiha immigrated to East Flatbush, Brooklyn from Haiti in 1979. He worked as a parking garage attendant while attending Fordham College. He earned a doctorate in economics at the New School.

From 2003 to 2005, Jiha worked as a deputy state comptroller and chief investment officer for the New York Common Retirement Fund under state comptroller Alan G. Hevesi, who eventually pleaded guilty for his role in a pay-for-play scheme. Jiha was pushed out of the comptroller’s office for not favoring recommended private equity managers.

Jiha was appointed as the New York City Commissioner of Finance by Mayor Bill de Blasio on April 8, 2014. Jiha succeeded Beth Goldman, the acting commissioner who had been serving since September 2013 following the resignation of David Frankel. Goldman was a holdover from the Bloomberg administration. On November 1, 2020, Jiha was appointed by Mayor de Blasio as Director of the New York City Mayor's Office of Management and Budget. In this role, he oversees New York City’s fiscal policy, including the development of the Expense and Capital Budgets, the City’s bond and borrowing program, and the budgets of more than 90 City agencies and related entities. On December 23, 2021, Mayor-elect Eric Adams announced that Jiha would continue to serve as the Budget Director in the new administration.

References 

1958 births
Living people
The New School alumni
Fordham University alumni
American financial analysts
American chief operating officers
Haitian emigrants to the United States
American politicians of Haitian descent
New York City Department of Finance
Commissioners in New York City
Haitian economists